The 1940 United States presidential election in South Carolina took place on November 5, 1940. All contemporary 48 states were part of the 1940 United States presidential election. State voters chose 8 electors to the Electoral College, which selected the president and vice president.

South Carolina was won by incumbent Democratic President Franklin D. Roosevelt of New York, who was running against Republican businessman Wendell Willkie of New York. Roosevelt ran with Henry A. Wallace of Iowa as his running mate, and Willkie ran with Senator Charles L. McNary of Oregon. Notably, Communist Party USA candidate Earl Browder was on the ballot in every county, but failed to win a single vote in the entire state.

Roosevelt won South Carolina by a landslide margin of 91.27%.

Results

Results by county

Notes

References

South Carolina
1940
1940 South Carolina elections